Monoplacophorus zenkevitchi is a species of monoplacophoran, a superficially limpet-like marine mollusc. It is known from only one specimen collected from a depth of 2000 metres in the Pacific Ocean, north of Johnston Island and west of Hawaii.

References

Monoplacophora
Molluscs described in 1983